Marie Elisabeth Chichester Rideal (born 1954 in Aylesbury, Buckinghamshire) is a British artist, art historian, educator and author. She is a Professor in Fine Art in the Painting Department at the Slade School of Fine Art, University College London and was a lecturer and educational resource writer at the National Portrait Gallery, London. She is known for her early artwork, fine art photography made using a photo-booth. Rideal currently lives and works in London, England.

Early life and education
Born in May 1954 in Aylesbury, Buckinghamshire, England. Rideal attended Exeter University and art college and received her B.A. in Fine Arts and English Literature in 1976 and later earned her Post Graduate Certificate in Education in 1978. Since 1992 she has been lecturing at Slade School of Fine Art, which is part of University College London.

Photography 
In 1985, Rideal started working exclusively with the photo-booth, creating a number of public art projects and investigating ways of using photographic strip digits within photographic collages literally making light drawings using hand gestures in the photo-booth.  Many artists have toyed with this low-budget technology, but few have explored its formal possibilities so extensively as this photographer.

Rideal's artwork has been collected by many public institutions, including Tate Modern, British Museum, BBC, Bibliothèque Nationale, Cambridge University Library, the Library of Congress, the National Portrait Gallery (London), Vancouver Art Gallery (Canada), New York Public Library, Victoria and Albert Museum, Brandts Museum of Photographic Art (Denmark) and more.

Additionally, Rideal's artwork has been collected by private institutions including; The Pfizer, Inc. Collection, the Seagram Collection, the Microsoft Art Collection, and the JP Morgan Chase Collection.

Bibliography

Books 

 Mirror Mirror: Self-Portraits by Women Artists. by Liz Rideal and contributions by Frances Borzello and Whitney Chadwick, Watson-Guptill, 2002. 
 Insights: Self-portraits: National Portrait Gallery Insights, National Portrait Gallery, London, 2005; 
 How to Read Art: A Crash Course in Understanding and Interpreting Paintings, Bloomsbury, London, 2014. 
 How to Read Art: A Crash Course in Understanding and Interpreting Paintings, Rizzoli, New York, 2015. 
 Madam & Eve: Women Portraying Women, co-authored with Kathleen Soriano, Laurence King Publishing, London, 2018,

Contributions 

 The Erotic Cloth: Seduction and Fetishism in Textiles, ed. Millar and Kettle, Bloomsbury Academic, 2018, contributions from Rideal are a chapter titled, "Erotic Cloth echoes in film."
 500 Self-portraits, published by Phaidon, 2018., contributions from Rideal are a new introduction.

Awards
2016–2017 – Leverhulme Fellowship
2011 – British Academy, an award to work in India
2008–2009 – Rome Wingate Scholarship in Fine Art at the British School at Rome
2005 – British Council
2004 – The Lorne Scholarship & University College London, Dean's Travel Award
2002 – Riba (Special Mention for Glass Drapes at the Birmingham Hippodrome)
1997 – London Arts Board, Individual Artist Award
1988 – West Midlands & Northern Arts
1987 – Eastern Arts
1986 – Scottish Arts Council
1982 – South East Arts

See also 
 Women in the art history field

References

External links
Gallery 339
Photobooth.Net
LizRideal.com
NYTimes.com | Art In Review

1954 births
Living people
Photographers from Buckinghamshire
Fine art photographers
English women photographers
People from Aylesbury